is a subprefecture of Tokyo Metropolis, Japan. The organization of government belongs to the Tokyo Metropolitan Government Bureau Of General Affairs. Hachijō includes the following towns and villages in the Izu Islands:

Hachijō (town on Hachijō-jima and Hachijō-kojima)
Aogashima (village on Aogashima)

The subprefecture has an area of 78.6 square km, with a population of 8,790.

Additionally, Hachijō includes the four southernmost Izu Islands, which are uninhabited. These islands currently do not belong to any municipality; both Hachijō and Aogashima claim administrative rights. From north to south, the islands are:

Bayonnaise Rocks (Beyonēzu Retsugan)
Smith Island (Sumisu-tō)
Tori-shima
Lot's Wife (Sōfu-iwa)

Among the islands of the subprefecture, only Hachijōjima and Aogashima are inhabited.

External links
Hachijō Island Branch Office Official Website 

Subprefectures in Tokyo
Izu Islands